"Recognize" is a song by Canadian singer PartyNextDoor. It was released as his third single from his debut studio album, PartyNextDoor Two, on July 15, 2014. The song was produced by PartyNextDoor himself and features guest vocals from Canadian rapper Drake.

Music video
The song's accompanying music video premiered on August 14, 2014 on PartyNextDoor's YouTube account. Since its release, the music video has received over 210 million views on YouTube.

Charts

Weekly charts

Certifications

References

External links

PartyNextDoor songs
Drake (musician) songs
2014 songs
2014 singles
Song recordings produced by PartyNextDoor
Songs written by Drake (musician)
Songs written by PartyNextDoor
OVO Sound singles
Warner Records singles